Khail may refer to:

People
 Pope Michael I of Alexandria (Khail I) (ruled 743–767)
 Pope Michael II of Alexandria (Khail II) (ruled 849–851)
 Pope Michael III of Alexandria (Khail III) (ruled 880–907)
 Pope Michael IV of Alexandria (Khail IV) (ruled 1092–1102)
 Hafizullah Shabaz Khail (born 1946)
 Mohammed bin Ali Aba Al Khail (born 1935), Saudi Arabian government official

Places

 Tari Khail, Pakistan